The Fonderie Olive, in English, Olive Foundry, was a small but high-profile type foundry located in Marseille, France. It is best known for the work of the typeface designer Roger Excoffon. In 1978 the foundry was acquired by the Mergenthaler Linotype Company which transferred photocomposition rights for all faces to Haas.

Typefaces
These foundry types were produced by Fonderie Olive:

References

Letterpress font foundries of France
Metal companies of France
Manufacturing companies based in Marseille